Actin-related protein 2 is a protein that in humans is encoded by the ACTR2 gene.

The specific function of ACTR2 has not yet been determined. However, it is known to be a major constituent of the ARP2/3 complex. This complex is located at the cell surface and is essential to cell shape and motility through lamellipodial actin assembly and protrusion. Two transcript variants encoding different isoforms have been found for this gene.

References

Further reading

External links
 
 

Human proteins